Star Hub TV  is a pay television service provided by StarHub in Singapore. It has been a subsidiary of StarHub Limited since StarHub acquired Singapore Cable Vision (SCV) in 2001, and was the sole pay-TV operator in the country until 2007 when mio TV (now Singtel TV), an IPTV service from its competitor, Singtel, was launched.

The company offers IPTV services via the optical fibre network. It also provides this service via a wireless network, the Digital Terrestrial Television system.

Company history
The history of cable TV in Singapore started on 11 July 1991 when the then Singapore Cable Vision (SCV) was licensed to establish a nationwide broadband cable network to provide pay-TV services. SCV also had the unprecedented responsibility of delivering terrestrial free-to-air (FTA) channels to Singapore households via its cable points, free-of-charge to viewers.

In 1999, SCV completed the construction of its S$600 million network, and in recognition of its nationwide cabling effort, SCV was granted exclusivity in the provision of pay-TV services until 2002. As the nation developed, Singaporeans began to embrace pay-TV as an additional source of lifestyle entertainment, in addition to other entertainment sources such as cinemas, the internet, and DVD/VCD purchases/rentals.

In 2002, StarHub completed its merger with Singapore Cable Vision and has adopted its name until in 2007, where StarHub Cable Television was renamed to StarHub TV, its current name.

On 17 February 2009, StarHub announced that their television will be converted to digital and analogue set-top boxes will be terminated by 30 June 2009, beginning a phase of digital television transition in Singapore.

On 30 April 2010, channel numbers for StarHub TV were overhauled into a three-digit numbering system, allowing easier recall for subscribers. The channels were also classified into eight categories based on their genre and first number.

On 1 August 2010, StarHub TV will cease broadcasting the Barclays English Premier League for the 2010/11, 2011/12 and 2012/13 seasons as it did not procure the rights to do so. Its carriage of Goal TV 1, Goal TV 2, ESPN, STAR Sports and STAR Cricket will also cease at the same time. The ESS channels were unavailable on StarHub's platform for three years until in December 2012, it was announced that ESPN, STAR Sports and STAR Cricket will return to StarHub on 14 December on a non-exclusive basis. The channel was revived after StarHub TV acquired its rights to broadcast the 2018-19 season of UEFA Champions League.

Rediffusion Singapore was added to StarHub TV in October 2010 as RediGold, the first FM channel to be broadcast on cable television; however, both Rediffusion and RediGold ceased transmission on 1 May 2012 due to a decline in listenership. Rediffusion resumed its transmission on 11 November 2013, but through internet.

Since 2010, many channels were made for free-viewing for a brief period of time to commemorate a holiday. Its first free preview was held between 28 May to 13 June due to a school holiday. Since then, a weeklong free previewing of channels were held on other major public holidays.

On 31 May 2011, StarHub TV's Preview Channel (Channel 101) became ScreenSingapore Channel for a duration from 1 to 19 June, before reverting to Preview Channel.

Many channels had, over time, ceased broadcast on StarHub TV to make way for newer channels, such as JimJam, JET TV, NEO Cricket, TTV World and MGM. On 15 February 2012, Playin' TV, a television-gaming service channel, was also ceased.

On 1 October 2012, StarHub TV ceased two of three cricket channels for Cricket Extra and NEO Cricket; the remaining channel, TEN Cricket was still purchasable as an add-on channel ($32.10/month) until STAR Cricket was added.

In February 2012 and January 2013, StarHub launched two new channels (Channel 114 and Channel 873, respectively) that were made temporarily for the first time, which were coincidentally right next to the two KBS World channels to inform subscribers about when the channels have their last-day free-to-air and which groups they will be in respectively. Channel 110, the former Sunsilk Academy Fantasia channel, had remained unused since October 2012.

On 18 March 2013, StarHub launched its first fibre-optic IPTV television, beginning another transition of cable television. The IPTV was rolled out to residential customers on 8 April 2015.

In an announcement made on 1 November 2018, cable television will cease transmission by 30 June 2019. However, StarHub followed up with another announcement on 24 June 2018, saying that cable services will end on 30 September 2019 instead, giving consumers until 31 August 2019 to switch to fibre. StarHub completed the move to fibre networks on 30 September 2019.

References

External links 
 StarHub TV official website

Broadcasting in Singapore
Mass media companies established in 1991
Telecommunications companies established in 1991
Television channels and stations established in 1991